The Tithe Barn is a 14th-century tithe barn in Dunster, Somerset, England.

It has a cruciform plan. The east front has central double doors in heavy oak with a chamfered frame. It is a grade II listed building.

The barn, which was originally part of a Benedictine Dunster Priory, has been much altered since the 14th century and only a limited amount of the original features survive. In the "Valor Ecclesiasticus" of 1535 the net annual income of the Dunster Tithe Barn is recorded as being £37.4.8d (£37 23p), with £6.13s7d ( £6.68p ) being passed on to the priory in Bath.

The Somerset Buildings Preservation Trust (SBPT) has co-ordinated a £550,000 renovation project on behalf of the Dunster Tithe Barn Community Hall Trust (DTBCHT), into a multi-purpose community hall under a 99-year lease at a pepper-corn rent, by the Crown Estate Commissioners who own the building. Funding has been obtained from the Heritage Lottery Fund and others to support the work.

References

External links 
  Official website
 Tithe Barn History Information
 Photos of the Tithe Barn, Dunster

Grade II listed buildings in West Somerset
Tourist attractions in Somerset
Barns in England
Tithe barns in Europe